Patricia A. Wallach is a former mayor of El Monte, California, and a former member of the El Monte City Council. She is a registered Democrat.

Wallach was the city's mayor from 1992 until 1999 where she was defeated by Rachel Montes, but ran for a council position in 2003 and won.

References

External links
Official El Monte website profile

Living people
Mayors of places in California
Women mayors of places in California
California Democrats
People from El Monte, California
Year of birth missing (living people)
21st-century American women